Arapahoe County is a county located in the U.S. state of Colorado. As of the 2020 census, its population was 655,070, making it the third-most populous county in Colorado. The county seat is Littleton, and the most populous city is Aurora. The county was named for the Arapaho Native American tribe, who once lived in the region.

Arapahoe County is part of the Denver-Aurora-Lakewood metropolitan statistical area. Arapahoe County calls itself "Colorado's First County", since its origins antedate the Pike's Peak Gold Rush.

History
On August 25, 1855, the Kansas Territorial Legislature created a huge Arapahoe County to govern the entire western portion of the Territory of Kansas. The county was named for the Arapaho Nation, who lived in the region.

In July 1858, gold was discovered along the South Platte River in Arapahoe County (in present-day Englewood). This discovery precipitated the Pike's Peak Gold Rush. Many residents of the mining region felt disconnected from the remote territorial governments of Kansas and Nebraska, so they voted to form their own Territory of Jefferson on October 24, 1859. The following month, the Jefferson Territorial Legislature organized 12 counties for the new territory, including a smaller Arapahoe County. Denver City served as the county seat of Arapahoe County.

The Jefferson Territory never received federal sanction, and when the State of Kansas was admitted to the Union on January 29, 1861, the mining regions temporarily reverted to unorganized territory. On February 28, 1861, Congress passed an act organizing the Territory of Colorado, using present-day borders. On November 1, 1861, the Colorado Territorial Assembly organized the 17 original counties of Colorado, including a new Arapahoe County. Arapahoe County originally stretched from the line of present-day Sheridan Boulevard 160 miles (258 km) east to the Kansas border, and from the line of present-day County Line Road 30 miles (48 km) north to the 40th parallel north (168th Avenue). Denver City served as the county seat of Arapahoe County until 1902.

In 1901, the Colorado General Assembly voted to split Arapahoe County into three parts - a new consolidated City and County of Denver, a new Adams County, and the remainder of the Arapahoe County to be renamed South Arapahoe County. A ruling by the Colorado Supreme Court, subsequent legislation, and a referendum delayed the reorganization until November 15, 1902. Governor James Bradley Orman designated Littleton as the temporary county seat of South Arapahoe County.  On April 11, 1903, the Colorado General Assembly changed the name of South Arapahoe County back to Arapahoe County.  On November 8, 1904, Arapahoe County voters chose Littleton over Englewood by a vote of 1310 to 829 to be the permanent county seat.

Geography

The county measures 72 mi (116 km) east-west and 4 to 12 mi (6 to 19 km) north-south.

Two exclaves of Arapahoe County are entirely surrounded by the City and County of Denver, the City of Glendale, and the Holly Hills neighborhood, a census-designated place.

Adjacent counties
City and County of Denver – northwest and exclaves
Adams County – north
Washington County – east
Lincoln County – southeast
Elbert County – south
Douglas County – southwest
Jefferson County – west

Major highways
  Interstate 25
  Interstate 70
  Interstate 225

  U.S. Highway 85
  U.S. Highway 285
  State Highway 30
  State Highway 36
  State Highway 40
  State Highway 75
  State Highway 79
  State Highway 83
  State Highway 88
  State Highway 177
  State Highway 470
E-470 (tollway)

State park
Cherry Creek State Park

Historic trails
Smoky Hill Trail
South Platte Trail

Recreation trails
Highline Canal National Recreation Trail
Platte River Greenway National Recreation Trail

Demographics

As of the census of 2000,  487,967 people, 190,909 households, and 125,809 families were residing in the county.  The population density was 608 people/sq mi (235/km2).  The 196,835 housing units averaged 245/sq mi (95/km2).  The racial makeup of the county was 79.93% White, 7.67% African American, 0.66% Native American, 3.95% Asian, 0.12% Pacific Islander, 4.51% from other races, and 3.16% from two or more races.  Hispanics or Latinos of any race made up 11.81% of the population .

Of the 190,909 households,  34.90% had children under the age of 18 living with them, 51.20% were married couples living together, 10.60% had a female householder with no husband present, and 34.10% were not families. About 27.00% of all households were made up of individuals, and 5.90% had someone living alone who was 65 years of age or older.  The average household size was 2.53, and the average family size was 3.11.

In the county, the age distribution was 26.70% under  18, 8.60% from 18 to 24, 33.10% from 25 to 44, 23.00% from 45 to 64, and 8.60% who were 65  or older.  The median age was 34 years. For every 100 females, there were 97.10 males.  For every 100 females age 18 and over, there were 94.20 males.

The median income for a household was $53,570, and for a family was $63,875. Males had a median income of $41,601 versus $31,612 for females. The per capita income for the county was $28,147.  About 4.20% of families and 5.80% of the population were below the poverty line, including 7.00% of those under age 18 and 5.10% of those age 65 or over.

Politics
Arapahoe County was once a Republican stronghold, and a classic bastion of suburban conservatism, although with a noticeable north–south split, with the working class Democratic-leaning city of Aurora in the northwest and the former wealthy Republican strongholds in the Denver Technological Center region in the southwest, though with some Democratic strength in older, more urbanized and mixed-development suburbs bordering Denver's southwest border near Hampden Avenue such as Englewood and Sheridan (the eastern parts of the county are extremely rural and Republican to this day). However, heavy urbanization, demographic changes and population increases - such as the rapid diversification of Aurora's population and younger professionals in the southern suburbs - have caused the county to become much more competitive since the 1990s, eventually changing it to more of a Democratic-leaning suburban swing county. In 2008, the county swung over dramatically to support Barack Obama, who became the first Democrat to carry it since 1964, and only the second since 1936. It swung from a four-point win for George W. Bush in 2004 to a 13-point win for Obama in 2008. It voted for Obama by a similar margin in 2012, and provided much of Hillary Clinton's statewide margin in 2016 as Donald Trump failed to win even 40 percent of the vote in one of the worst showings for a Republican in the county's history, with the Democrats carrying the former Tech Center area Republican strongholds of Centennial and Littleton. In the 2020 election, Joe Biden became the first Democrat to carry the county with over 60% of the vote since 1916, winning both Aurora by lopsided margins and the southern parts of the county by nearly 20 points.

Communities

Cities

Aurora (most; also extends into Adams County and Douglas County)
Centennial
Cherry Hills Village
Englewood
Glendale
Greenwood Village
Littleton (most; also extends into Douglas County and Jefferson County)
Sheridan

Towns

Bennett
Bow Mar (part; also extends into Jefferson County)
Columbine Valley
Deer Trail
Foxfield

Census-designated places

Aetna Estates
Brick Center
Byers
Cherry Creek
Columbine
Comanche Creek
Dove Valley
Four Square Mile
Holly Hills
Inverness
Peoria
Strasburg
Watkins

Former census-designated places
Castlewood (now part of Centennial)
Southglenn (now part of Centennial)

See also

Arapahoe Library District
Outline of Colorado
Index of Colorado-related articles
Arapahoe County, Kansas Territory
Arrappahoe County, Jefferson Territory
Arapahoe County, Colorado Territory
South Arapahoe County, Colorado
Colorado census statistical areas
Denver–Aurora–Boulder Combined Statistical Area
Front Range Urban Corridor
National Register of Historic Places listings in Arapahoe County, Colorado

References

External links

Colorado County Evolution by Don Stanwyck
Colorado Historical Society

 

 
Colorado counties
Colorado placenames of Native American origin
1861 establishments in Colorado Territory
Eastern Plains
Populated places established in 1861